Richard John Gordon (born 16 March 1958) is a former Scotland international rugby union player. He played at Centre.

Rugby Union career

Amateur career

He played for London Scottish.

Provincial career

He was capped by Anglo-Scots district.

International career

He received one cap for Scotland 'B' against France 'B' on 7 February 1982.

He later received 2 full senior caps with Scotland; both in 1982 and both against Australia on the 1982 Scotland rugby union tour of Australia.

References

1958 births
Living people
Scottish rugby union players
Scotland international rugby union players
Scotland 'B' international rugby union players
Rugby union centres
Scottish Exiles (rugby union) players
London Scottish F.C. players
Middlesex County RFU players